Hamstead may refer to:

 Hamstead, Isle of Wight
 Hamstead, West Midlands
Hamstead Colliery
Hamstead railway station
 Hamstead Marshall, Berkshire, England
Hamstead Lock, on the Kennet and Avon Canal

See also 
Hampstead (disambiguation)
Hempstead (disambiguation)
Homestead (disambiguation)